Allumwandlung (German for "complete promotion", sometimes abbreviated AUW) is a chess problem theme where, at some stage in the solution, a pawn (or sometimes pawns) is promoted variously to a queen, rook, bishop, and knight. Allumwandlung's main requirement is promotion, either a white pawn or a black pawn. A Babson task may appear if both pawns are spotted in an individual problem, corresponding one another.

Example
The diagram shows a chess problem with Allumwandlung composed by Niels Høeg and first published in 1905. White to move and mate in three. The key move (White's first move) is 1.f7, and depending on how Black defends, White promotes to either a queen, a rook, a bishop or a knight on move two. The lines are:
 1... e4 2. f8=Q any 3. Qe7/Qf6#
 1... Kd6 2. f8=Q Kc6 3. Qc5#
 1... exf4 2. f8=R Kd6 3. Rf6#
 1... exd4 2. f8=B Kf6 3. Ra6#
 1... Kf6 2. f8=N exd4 3. Rf7#

The importance of White's underpromotions can be understood by considering what happens if White promotes to a queen no matter what Black plays: 

 After 1...exf4 or 1...exd4 2.f8=Q is stalemate, as black no longer has a legal move to play. 
 Following 1...Kf6 2.f8=Q+ Kxg6, the checkmate will take more than three moves to achieve and therefore does not meet the stated conditions of the chess problem.

References

Bibliography
 

Chess problems